The Scottish Derby was a Group 2 flat horse race in Great Britain open to thoroughbreds aged three years or older. It was run at Ayr over a distance of 1 mile and 2 furlongs (2,012 metres), and it was scheduled to take place each year in July.

History
The event was established in 1979, and it was initially restricted to three-year-olds. The first edition was contested over 1 mile and 5 furlongs. It was shortened by two furlongs in 1980. It was cut by another furlong and opened to older horses in 1987.

The race was originally known as the Scottish Derby, but it was renamed the Scottish Classic in 1988. For a period it held Group 3 status. It reverted to its former title and was promoted to Group 2 level in 2003.

The Scottish Derby was last run in 2005. It was replaced the following year by a similar race, the York Stakes at York.

Over the course of twenty-seven runnings the event had several different sponsors. These included Mecca Bookmakers, Tennent's and the Daily Record.

Records
Most successful horse:
 no horse won this race more than once

Leading jockey (4 wins):
 Kieren Fallon – Winter Romance (1998), Carnival Dancer (2001), Princely Venture (2003), Kalaman (2004)

Leading trainer (6 wins):
 Sir Michael Stoute – Dazari (1983), Ascot Knight (1987), Carnival Dancer (2001), Princely Venture (2003), Kalaman (2004), Imperial Stride (2005)

Winners

 The 2004 winner Kalaman was later exported to Hong Kong and renamed Oriental Magic.

See also
 Horse racing in Great Britain
 Horse racing in Scotland
 List of British flat horse races

References

 Racing Post:
 galopp-sieger.de – Scottish Classic.
 horseracingintfed.com – International Federation of Horseracing Authorities – Scottish Derby (2005).
 pedigreequery.com – Scottish Derby – Ayr.
 

Flat races in Great Britain
Ayr Racecourse
Open middle distance horse races
Recurring sporting events established in 1979
Discontinued horse races
Sports competitions in Scotland
1979 establishments in Scotland
2005 disestablishments in Scotland
Recurring sporting events disestablished in 2005